The Heidelberg Institute for International Conflict Research (HIIK) is an independent and interdisciplinary registered association located at the Department of Political Science at the University of Heidelberg. Since 1991, the HIIK has been committed to the distribution of knowledge about the emergence, course and settlement of interstate and intrastate political conflicts. The Conflict Barometer is published annually and contains the current research results.

Conflict Barometer 
The HIIK's annual publication Conflict Barometer describes the recent trends in global conflict developments, escalations, de-escalations, and settlements. Coup d'état, attempted coups d'états, as well as implemented measures of conflict resolution are also reported. It is subdivided into five world regions and presents all present conflicts in detailed charts and short descriptions. The methodological approach consists of the conflict definition and the measuring of the conflict intensity.

Methodology after 2011 
Following a methodological revision in 2011, changes in the Heidelberg methodology included allocating intensities not only based on state units and calendar years, but also on the level of subnational units and calendar months. Furthermore, the establishment of intensities now follows an analysis of clearly conceived proxy indicators, used for the assessment of means and consequences of a conflict measure. This analysis continues to be based on the actions of conflict actors, as well as the communication between them. Through the conceptual refinement and standardization of data collection and documentation, the HIIK data achieves a higher degree of precision, reliability, and comprehensibility regarding information on political conflicts.

Conflict definition 
A political conflict is a positional difference between at least two assertive and directly involved actors regarding values relevant to a society (the conflict items including (territory, secession, decolonization, autonomy, system/ideology, national power, regional predominance, international power, resources, other)) which is carried out using observable and interrelated conflict measures that lie outside established regulatory procedures and threaten core state functions, the international order, or hold the prospect of doing so.
	According to the Heidelberg (1998) methodology and ideology, the essence of a political conflict lies in a contradiction, adequately represented by the concept of a “positional difference”: a positional difference is a perceived incompatibility of ideas and beliefs. It presupposes the presence of the following elements:
(1) There must be at least two entities possessing intellectual capacity and vision, and who are capable of communicating. Such an entity is called an actor.
(2) In order for the actors to sense incompatibility between their ideas and beliefs, there must be reciprocal actions and acts of communication between said actors. These actions and acts of communication are called measures.
(3) A communicating act always refers to a specific issue, an action always refers to a certain object. The subject behind a measure is called item.
For the purpose of defining the term political conflict more precisely, the three elements aforementioned shall be further defined. These elements are necessary requirements for the existence of a political conflict.

Conflict intensities

Annual conflict summary
The table below presents data after the 2011 methodology revision. Violent conflicts include highly violent ones, the latter being classified into limited and full-scale wars.

See also 
 Peace and conflict studies
 Conflict resolution

External links 
 Heidelberg Institute for International Conflict Research (HIIK)
 Conflict Barometer published since 1992 as PDF-Download
 Methodological Approach

Conflict (process)
Political science organizations